Nationality words link to articles with information on the nation's poetry or literature (for instance, Irish or France).

Events 
 June 2 – The Irvine Burns Club is formed at the Milne's Inn under the presidency of Dr. John MacKenzie, who had known the Scottish poet Robert Burns.

Works published

United Kingdom
 Eliza Acton, Poems, Ipswich: R. Deck
 Thomas Aird, Murtzoufle: a tragedy
 Anna Laetitia Barbauld, A Legacy for Young Ladies, poetry and prose, edited by Lucy Aikin, posthumous
 George Borrow, Romantic Ballads
 Elizabeth Barrett (later Browning), published anonymously, An Essay on Mind, with Other Poems
 James Hogg, Queen Hynde
 Thomas Hood, Whims and Oddities, poetry and prose (see also, Whims and Oddities 1827)
 Henry Hart Milman, Anne Boleyn
 Amelia Opie, The Black Man's Lament; or, How to Make Sugar
 Robert Millhouse, The Song of the Patriot: sonnets and songs.
 Ann Radcliffe, Gaston de Blondeville; Keeping Festival in Ardenne; St. Alban's Abbey, poetry and prose, with a memoir by Thomas Noon Talfourd; posthumously published
 Percy Bysshe Shelley, Miscellaneous and Posthumous Poems of Percy Bysshe Shelley, unauthorized; parts reissued the same year as Miscellaneous Poems

United States
 William Cullen Bryant, "I Cannot Forget with What Fervid Devotion", poem, first published this year, revised in 1832, possibly written as early as 1815
 Samuel Woodworth, Melodies, Duets, Songs, and Ballads, including "The Bucket" (first published in 1817 and first published in a collection in 1818); the poem was set to music and became popular as "The Old Oaken Bucket"); another poem in the collection is "The Hunters of Kentucky", a ballad praising those who helped General Andrew Jackson win the Battle of New Orleans, United States

Other
 Ivan Gundulić, Osman, an epic, first published (oldest existing copy is from 1651), describes the 1621 Polish victory over the Turks at Chocim (Khotin, Ukraine), posthumous, Croatia
 Wilhelm Hauff, editor, contributor, Kriegs- und Volks-Lieder ("War and Folk Songs"), anthology of poetry, including two of his own folk songs, "Reiters Morgengesang" ("Morning Song of the Rider") and "Soldatenliebe" ("Soldier's Love"), Germany
 Heinrich Heine, Germany
 Die Heimkehr ("The Homecoming")
 Die Nordsee ("The North Sea", first cycle)
 Friedrich Hölderlin, Gedichte, the author's first collected edition, Germany
 Victor Hugo, Odes et Ballades, France
 Adam Mickiewicz, Crimean Sonnets, inspired by a trip to Odessa during his exile in Russia, Poland
 Amable Tastu, Poésies, France
 Charles Tompson, Wild Notes from the Lyre of a Native Minstrel, the first volume of poetry written by a native-born Australian
 Alfred de Vigny, Poèmes antiques et modernes (expanded edition, 1829), France

Births 
Death years link to the corresponding "[year] in poetry" article:
 February 27 – Cynthia Roberts Gorton, American poet and author (died 1894)
 March 12 – Robert Lowry, American hymnodist (died 1899)
 April 20 – Dinah Craik (born "Dinah Maria Mulock", also often credited as "Miss Mulock"), English novelist and poet (died 1887)
 July 4 – Stephen Foster, American songwriter (died 1864)

Deaths 
Birth years link to the corresponding "[year] in poetry" article:
 April 3 – Reginald Heber (born 1783), Church of England bishop, remembered chiefly as a hymn-writer
 June 23 – John Taylor (born 1750), English businessman, poet and hymn-writer
 June 27 – Mary Leadbeater (born 1758), Irish poet and writer
 July 25 (July 13 O.S.) – Kondraty Ryleyev (born 1795), Russian poet and revolutionary, hanged
 October 3 – Jens Baggesen (born 1764), Danish
 December 26 – Schack von Staffeldt (born 1769), Danish poet and Amtmann
 December 31 – William Gifford (born 1756), English satiric poet and literary editor
 William Glen (born 1789), Scottish

See also

 Poetry
 List of years in poetry
 List of years in literature
 19th century in literature
 19th century in poetry
 Romantic poetry
 Golden Age of Russian Poetry (1800–1850)
 Weimar Classicism period in Germany, commonly considered to have begun in 1788  and to have ended either in 1805, with the death of Friedrich Schiller, or 1832, with the death of Goethe
 List of poets

Notes

19th-century poetry
Poetry